Pata De Gallo Airport  is an extremely high elevation airport serving the town of Quiruvilca (es) in the La Libertad Region of Peru.

Quiruvilca Airport

See also

Transport in Peru
List of airports in Peru

References

External links
OpenStreetMap - Pata De Gallo
SkyVector - Pata De Gallo

Airports in Peru
Buildings and structures in La Libertad Region